Gerry John Simpson is a professor of law at the London School of Economics and the University of Melbourne in Victoria, Australia. He was born in Fraserburgh, Aberdeenshire. 
Simpson studied law at the University of Aberdeen, the University of British Columbia, and the University of Michigan in Ann Arbor, where he received his doctorate of law. He has taught at the University of British Columbia, the University of Melbourne, and the Australian National University. He has also served as a visiting professor at Sydney Law School (1996) and Harvard Law School (1999).

References 
 University of Melbourne Law School: Gerry Simpson
 London School of Economics: Gerry Simpson

Australian legal scholars
Academic staff of the University of Melbourne
University of British Columbia alumni
University of Michigan Law School alumni
Harvard Law School faculty
Academics of the London School of Economics
Year of birth missing (living people)
Living people